Bad Boy Records (or Bad Boy Entertainment)  is an American record label founded in 1993 by rapper Sean "Puffy" Combs. It operates as an imprint of Epic Records, a division of Sony Music Entertainment. It has been home to many artists, including Craig Mack, The Notorious B.I.G., Faith Evans, 112, Total, The LOX, Ma$e, Shyne and Carl Thomas.

History

Beginnings
After his climb from a non-paid internship to becoming an A&R executive at Uptown, Sean "Puffy" Combs was fired in 1993 by Andre Harrell and founded his own label, Bad Boy Records, later that year. The label's first release was "Flava in Ya Ear" by Craig Mack, followed quickly by Mack's debut album, Project Funk da World in 1994. On the heels of these releases came "Juicy" and Ready to Die, the lead single and debut album from The Notorious B.I.G. (a.k.a. Biggie Smalls), released the same year. While Mack's album went Gold, Ready to Die achieved multi-platinum success. Dominating the charts in 1995, B.I.G. became one of the genre's biggest names of the day and Bad Boy's premier star. Also in 1995, the label continued its success with platinum releases by Total and Faith Evans. Bad Boy, meanwhile, staffed a bevy of in-house writer/producers, including: Easy Mo Bee, Chucky Thompson and D Dot—all of whom were instrumental in producing many of Bad Boy's most noted releases during this time.

Feud with Death Row Records and loss of The Notorious B.I.G.

The rapid success of The Notorious B.I.G., and Bad Boy as a company, raised some tensions, especially with the Beverly Hills, California-based Death Row Records.  For 3 years leading up to 1995, West Coast hip hop, dominated by labels such as Death Row, had been preeminent in mainstream Rap. Suge Knight, CEO of Death Row, held Puff Daddy responsible for the shooting death of his friend Jake Robles, allegedly at the hands of Sean Combs' bodyguard.  Tensions were heightened when Death Row signed 2Pac, who alleged that Bad Boy, notably The Notorious B.I.G. and Puff Daddy, had been complicit in the November 1994 shooting of Tupac in the lobby of Quad Studios in Times Square.

After the June 1996 release of 2Pac's "Hit 'Em Up", smearing Bad Boy, tensions escalated. 2Pac was shot in Las Vegas, Nevada on September 7, 1996, and died September 13. Bad Boy issued a statement of condolences. On March 9, 1997, while Bad Boy were preparing the release of The Notorious B.I.G.'s double album Life After Death, he was killed in Los Angeles, California.  Their deaths left many to speculate if the coastal hostility had been responsible for their deaths.  The police investigations were criticized by public and judicial sources. Both cases remain officially unsolved.

Life after The Notorious B.I.G. and rebuilding the label
Posthumously, Biggie's Life After Death reached number one on the Billboard Top 200. Its first two singles, "Hypnotize" and "Mo Money, Mo Problems" also topped the singles charts. The album eventually sold over 10 million copies in the U.S. alone, and is one of the highest selling rap albums ever in the U.S..

In 1996, Puff Daddy had begun recording his own solo debut album. The 1st single, "Can't Nobody Hold Me Down", peaked at No. 1 on the Rap, R&B, and pop charts that spring. In response to Biggie's death, the label rush-released a Puff Daddy tribute song, "I'll Be Missing You", which featured Biggie's widow, Faith Evans, and Bad Boy's R&B singing group 112. The single topped the charts for eleven weeks and became the hasty second single from Combs' album, No Way Out, which was released in the summer and sold 7 million copies in the U.S.. Mase, Combs' newest protégé, in the meantime was immediately thrust into the void that The Notorious B.I.G. left. His own debut album, Harlem World, also released the same year, would go Quadruple Platinum. Due to the successive successes of Life After Death, No Way Out and Harlem World, by the end of 1997, Bad Boy as a label and brand name had hit a commercial peak. During this time, the label began to promote its latest signing The L.O.X., who had been prominently featured on various Bad Boy releases that year. Highly anticipated, their 1998 debut album, Money, Power & Respect was certified Platinum by the RIAA. Shortly thereafter, the group departed the label and entered into a long-standing publishing dispute with Combs over the latter receiving 50% of their publishing that would continue until 2005.

In 1998, Combs decided to expand Bad Boy's roster to genres other than hip-hop and R&B, and subsequently signed Fuzzbubble to the label as its 1st rock act. The group appeared on the rock remix of Puff Daddy's "It's All About the Benjamins", but parted ways with the label before releasing a full-length album.

In the years to follow, Bad Boy saw a commercial decline. In 1999, Mase became religious and abruptly retired from the business, leaving a serious dent in the company, especially since his 2nd album had just been released. Bad Boy found some success with Shyne, a young rapper from Brooklyn, who garnered generally mixed reviews for his deep voice and slow flow—which many considered to be too reminiscent to, and perhaps a rip-off of The Notorious B.I.G., meanwhile, Combs' later albums failed to generate the same kind of acclaim that his debut had. In an attempt to further market himself, he underwent several name changes; from "Puff Daddy" to "Puffy" to "P. Diddy", to simply just "Diddy" then shortly Diddy- Dirty Money". But with the split of the group he abruptly returned to "Diddy".

As the 2000s emerged, Bad Boy had noticeably floundered. Many of its more noted acts would eventually vacate the label, while those who remained saw their album sales dwindle as time went on. In spite of continually releasing new material, and various attempts at building artists to the status of Bad Boy's The Notorious B.I.G., few proved as successful as the company hoped.

Southern rap duo 8Ball & MJG released an album called Living Legends to some success in 2004, prompting the creation of Bad Boy South—which would eventually house acts such as Yung Joc. In 2002, Combs' participated in MTV's Making The Band 2, which spun off the Bad Boy assembled act, Da Band. Their MTV exposure lead to a Gold selling debut album. At this time, the label also signed a rapper named Aasim, whose Bad Boy debut (as of 2013) still has not been released.

Resurgence
Bad Boy saw its fortunes improve in 2005, with the success of releases from new signees: Cassie and Yung Joc (both of whom would score top five singles/debut albums). Also in 2006, Bad Boy hit paydirt with Making The Band 3's Danity Kane, whose debut album topped the charts at No. 1 (the label's first chart topping album since the Bad Boys II soundtrack three years prior), and spun off a top five single. Their second album, Welcome to the Dollhouse also debuted at No. 1, and contained the group's second top ten single "Damaged". Diddy also signed Day26 and Donnie Klang to the label.

However, by 2009, Combs had dissolved Danity Kane, terminating Aubrey O'Day's, D. Woods', Shannon Bex's and Aundrea Fimbres' contracts. Dawn Richard remained signed working as solo artist and songwriter for Bad Boy. In March 2009, it was reported that Richard and Combs were assembling a new girl group but later formed Diddy – Dirty Money, composed of Combs, Richard and a singer-songwriter named Kalenna Harper. In April 2009, Bad Boy also signed Red Cafe.

In September 2009, it was announced that Combs would be leaving Warner, inking a new deal with Universal's Interscope. Under the terms of the new deal, Combs rebooted the Bad Boy name and trademark, to be operated through Interscope.  The previous Bad Boy catalog and roster, however, remains under the control of Warner.

2010–present
In 2010, Diddy offered Mase a 1-year release from Bad Boy to settle their differences after the 2009 incident with Mase wanting to be released from Bad Boy. With this Mase decided to retire from rap for good, although he was to be reassigned to Bad Boy after his year break was done. In 2011, under his new deal with Interscope-Geffen-A&M, Diddy stated he was looking for new talent to add to his new Bad Boy roster. Jay Electronica, who had close ties with Diddy, was originally planned to be signed to the label but had signed with Jay-Z's Roc Nation imprint instead. Machine Gun Kelly announced that he signed to Bad Boy/Interscope on August 3, 2011. French Montana and Los also were announced as signees to the label in 2012.

On April 25, 2012, Mase featured alongside Diddy on Wale's "Slight Work" remix, marking the first appearance of the Harlem rapper on record since 2010. Rumors began to start that Mase, as well as singer Omarion, were both signing to Rick Ross' Maybach Music Group. It was later revealed that Bad Boy artist French Montana was the reason Mase was making his third comeback. According to Montana, Mase is serving as an A&R representative on Montana's forthcoming Bad Boy debut, "Excuse My French", as well as appearing on the remix of Montana's "Everything's a Go". "I'm not sure what kind of decisions he's going to make," Montana says, "[but] I would love to see him in my camp." Mase is currently resigned to Bad Boy Records but has yet to announce whether he is resigned as part of a joint venture deal between Bad Boy and MMG. He later announced he had gotten his release from Bad Boy. In April 2013, Cassie released her first full-length project seven years after her debut album, a mixtape titled RockaByeBaby, to positive reception. Rapper Los announced his departure from Bad Boy Records on March 19, 2014.

On October 5, 2015, Combs announced that Bad Boy would be distributed by Epic Records. This will mark the second time that Epic president L.A. Reid oversaw distribution for Bad Boy, having previously overseen distribution for the label 15 years earlier after being appointed president of Arista in 2000. Despite founding the label in 1993, Bad Boy began celebrating their 20th anniversary in 2015 with a 20-minute mega-medley performance at the BET Awards. It stretched into 2016, starting with the label's May reunion sold-out shows at the Barclays Center in Brooklyn, and originating the Bad Boy Family Reunion Tour, starting in North America in the last week of August 2016.

Notable artists

Current

Former

The Notorious B.I.G. (deceased) (1993 - 1997)
French Montana (2012 – 2022)
Craig Mack (deceased) (1993 – 1995)
Faith Evans (1994 - 2004)
Total (1994 - 2000)
112 (1995 - 2005)
Mase (1996 - 2000; 2003 - 2006)
Mario Winans (2001 - 2008)
The Lox (1996 - 1999)
Black Rob (deceased) (1996 - 2010)
Jordan McCoy
Carl Thomas (1997 - 2005)
Shyne (1998 - 2001)
Dream
G. Dep (incarcerated) (1999 - 2005)
Loon (2001 - 2006)
Da Band (2002 - 2004)
Fuzzbubble
8Ball & MJG (2002 - 2008)
Boyz n da Hood (2004-2008)
Cheri Dennis (2000 - 2009)
Kalenna Harper
New Edition (2003 - 2006)
Red Café
B5 (2004 - 2008)
Yung Joc (2004 - 2009)
Dirty Money
Gorilla Zoe
Danity Kane
King Los
Day26
Elephant Man (2006 - 2009)
Donnie Klang
Foxy Brown
Cassie

The Hitmen

The Hitmen is the production team for Bad Boy Records. The collective consisted of several notable producers and musicians that either worked solo or alongside Combs in composing tracks for the artists on Bad Boy as well as outside the label.

On August 20, 2015, it was announced that Kanye West was a part of the current roster.

Discography

Albums

Label compilations

References

Bad Boy Entertainment
The Notorious B.I.G.
1993 establishments in New York City
Companies based in New York City
Contemporary R&B record labels
Hip hop record labels
Labels distributed by Warner Music Group
Music publishing companies of the United States
Music production companies
New York (state) record labels
Record labels established in 1993
Vanity record labels